Stede Bonnet (1688 – 10 December 1718) was an early 18th-century English/Barbadian pirate, also known as the Gentleman Pirate for the reason that he was a moderately wealthy landowner before turning to a life of crime. Bonnet was born into a wealthy English family on the island of Barbados, and inherited the family estate after his father's death in 1694. Despite his lack of sailing experience, Bonnet decided he should turn to piracy in the winter of 1716 or spring of 1717. He bought a sailing vessel, the Revenge, and travelled with his paid crew along the Eastern Seaboard of what is now the United States, capturing other vessels and burning other Barbadian ships. 

Bonnet set sail for Nassau in the Bahamas, to the haven for pirates known as the "Republic of Pirates", but he was seriously wounded en route during an encounter with a Spanish warship. After arriving in Nassau, Bonnet met Edward Teach, better known as the infamous pirate Blackbeard. Incapable of leading his crew, Bonnet temporarily ceded his ship's command to Blackbeard. Before separating in December 1717, Blackbeard and Bonnet plundered and captured merchant ships along the East Coast. After Bonnet failed to capture the Protestant Caesar, his crew abandoned him to join Blackbeard aboard the Queen Anne's Revenge. Bonnet stayed on Blackbeard's ship as a guest, and did not command a crew again until summer 1718, when he was pardoned by North Carolina governor Charles Eden and received clearance to undertake privateering against Spanish shipping interests. Bonnet was tempted to resume his piracy but did not want to lose his pardon, so he adopted the alias "Captain Thomas" and changed his ship's name to Royal James. He had returned to piracy by July 1718.

In August 1718, Bonnet anchored Royal James on an estuary of the Cape Fear River to careen and repair the ship. In late August and September, Colonel William Rhett, with the authorization of South Carolina's governor Robert Johnson, led a naval expedition against pirates on the river. Rhett's and Bonnet's men engaged in combat for hours, but the outnumbered pirates ultimately surrendered. Rhett arrested the pirates and brought them to Charles Town (now Charleston, South Carolina) in early October. Bonnet escaped on 24 October, but was soon recaptured on Sullivan's Island. On 10 November, Bonnet was brought to trial and charged with two acts of piracy. Judge Nicholas Trott sentenced him to death. Bonnet wrote to Governor Johnson to ask for clemency, but Johnson endorsed the judge's decision, and Bonnet was hanged in Charles Town on 10 December 1718.

Pre-criminal life
Stede Bonnet was born in 1688, as he was christened at Christ Church parish on 29 July 1688. It is not known where Bonnet received his education, but many who knew him described him as bookish; Judge Nicholas Trott alluded to Bonnet's liberal education when sentencing him. Bonnet married Mary Allamby in Bridgetown on 21 November 1709. They had three sons – Allamby (who died by 1715), Edward, and Stede Jr – and a daughter, Mary. The three surviving children were all younger than five when their father abandoned them for piracy. Edward's granddaughter, Anne Thomasine Clarke, was the wife of General Robert Haynes, who was Speaker of the Assembly of Barbados for 36 years.

In A General History of the Pyrates, Charles Johnson wrote that Bonnet was driven to piracy by Mary's nagging and "[d]iscomforts he found in a married State". Details of Bonnet's military service are unclear, but he held the rank of major in the Barbados militia. The rank was probably due to his land holdings, since deterring revolts by enslaved people was an important function of the militia. Bonnet's militia service coincided with the War of the Spanish Succession, but there is no record that he took part in the fighting.

Early career as a pirate
During the spring of 1717, Stede Bonnet decided to become a pirate, despite having no knowledge of shipboard life. He contracted a local shipyard to build him a sixty-ton sloop, which he equipped with ten guns and named the Revenge. This was unusual, as most pirates seized their ships by mutiny or by boarding them or by converting a privateer vessel to a pirate ship. Bonnet enlisted a crew of more than seventy men. He relied on his quartermaster and officer for their knowledge of sailing, and as a result, he was not highly respected by his crew. In another break from tradition, Bonnet paid his crew wages, not shares of plunder as most pirates did. Royal Navy intelligence reported that he departed Carlisle Bay, Barbados, under cover of darkness.

Bonnet's initial cruise took him to the coast of the Colony of Virginia, near the entrance of the Chesapeake Bay, where he captured and plundered four vessels, and burned the Barbadian ship Turbet to keep news of his crimes from his home island. He sailed north to New York City, taking two more ships, and picking up naval supplies and releasing captives at Gardiners Island. By August 1717, Bonnet had returned to the Carolinas, where he attacked two more ships, a brigantine from Boston and a Barbadian sloop. He stripped the brigantine, but brought the cargo-filled Barbadian sloop to an inlet off North Carolina to use for careening and repairing the Revenge. After the Barbadian sloop's tackle was used to careen the Revenge, the ship was dismantled for timber, and the remains were burned. In September 1717, Bonnet set course for Nassau, which was an infamous pirate den on the island of New Providence in the Bahamas. En route, he encountered, fought, and escaped from a Spanish man-of-war. The Revenge was badly damaged, Bonnet was seriously wounded, and half the crew of the sloop was killed or wounded in the encounter. Putting in at Nassau, Bonnet replaced his casualties and refitted the Revenge, increasing the sloop's armament to twelve guns.

Collaboration with Blackbeard
While at Nassau, Bonnet met Captain Benjamin Hornigold and Edward Teach for the first time; Teach, better known as Blackbeard, played a large role in the remainder of Bonnet's life. Disabled by his wounds, Bonnet temporarily ceded command of the Revenge to Blackbeard, but remained aboard as a guest of the more experienced pirate captain. Blackbeard and Bonnet weighed anchor and sailed northward to Delaware Bay, where they plundered eleven ships. On 29 September 1717, the Revenge, captained by Blackbeard, plundered the sloop Betty, which had a cargo full of Madeira wine. Captain Codd, whose merchant ship was taken on 12 October, described Bonnet as walking the deck in his nightshirt, lacking any command and still unwell from his wounds. The Revenge later captured and looted the Spofford and Sea Nymph, which were leaving Philadelphia. On 22 October, the Revenge stopped and robbed the Robert and Good Intent of their supplies.

Blackbeard and Bonnet left Delaware Bay and returned to the Caribbean in November, where they successfully continued their piracy. The lieutenant on board described the pirate vessels as one having 12 guns and 120 men and the other having eight guns and 30 men. The crew of the Concorde put up a fight, but surrendered after the pirates bombarded them with "two volleys of cannons and musketry". Blackbeard took the Concorde and sailed south into the Grenadines, where he renamed the ship Queen Anne's Revenge, possibly as an insult to King George I. Some time after 19 December, Bonnet and Blackbeard separated. Bonnet sailed into the western Caribbean. In March 1718, he encountered the 400-ton merchant vessel Protestant Caesar off Honduras. The ship escaped him, and his frustrated crew became restive. When Bonnet encountered Blackbeard again shortly afterwards, Bonnet's crew deserted him to join Blackbeard. Blackbeard put a henchman named Richards in command of the Revenge. Bonnet, surprised that his colleague had betrayed him, found himself as a guest aboard the Queen Anne's Revenge. Bonnet confided in a few loyal crew members that he was ready to give up his criminal life if he could exile himself in Spain or Portugal. Bonnet would not exercise command again until the summer of 1718.

Under Captain Richards, the Revenge captured a Jamaican sloop, the Adventure, captained by David Herriot. Herriot joined the pirates, and Blackbeard possessed three ships. Bonnet accompanied Blackbeard to South Carolina, where Blackbeard's four vessels blockaded the port of Charles Town in the late spring of 1718. Needing a place to rest and refit their vessels, Blackbeard and Bonnet headed north to Topsail Island, where the Queen Anne's Revenge ran aground and was lost. Leaving the remaining three vessels at Topsail Island, Blackbeard and Bonnet went ashore and journeyed to Bath, which was the capital of North Carolina. Once there, both men accepted pardons from Governor Charles Eden under King George's Act of Grace, putatively on condition of their renouncing piracy forever. While Blackbeard quietly returned to Topsail Island, Bonnet stayed in Bath to get a "clearance" to take the Revenge to Denmark's Caribbean colony of St. Thomas, where he planned to buy a letter of marque and go privateering against Spanish shipping. Eden granted Bonnet this clearance.

Resumption of pirate command
Bonnet returned to Topsail Island to find that Blackbeard had beached the majority of their former crew, robbed the Revenge and two other vessels of the squadron of most of their supplies, and sailed away for parts unknown aboard the sloop Adventure, carrying all the loot with him. In late June or early July 1718, Bonnet resumed command of the Revenge. Few, if any, of his original crew from Barbados were still aboard. Bonnet reinforced the Revenge by rescuing a number of men whom Blackbeard had marooned on a sandbar at Topsail Island.

Shortly after Bonnet resumed command, the crew of a bumboat told him that Blackbeard was moored in Ocracoke Inlet. Bonnet set sail at once to hunt down his treacherous ex-confederate, but could not find him, and Bonnet never met Blackbeard again. Although Bonnet apparently never discarded his hopes of reaching St. Thomas and getting his letter of marque, two pressing problems tempted him back into piracy. First, Blackbeard had stolen the food and supplies he and his men needed to subsist (one pirate testified at his trial that no more than ten or eleven barrels remained aboard the Revenge). Second, St. Thomas was in the midst of the Atlantic hurricane season, which would last until autumn. However, returning to freebooting meant nullifying Bonnet's pardon.

Hoping to preserve his pardon, Bonnet adopted the alias "Captain Thomas" and changed the Revenges name to the Royal James. The name Royal James that Bonnet conferred on his sloop was presumably a reference to the younger Prince James Stuart, and may suggest that Bonnet or his men had Jacobite sympathies. One of Bonnet's prisoners further reported witnessing Bonnet's men drinking to the health of the "Old Pretender" and wishing to see him king of the English nation.

Bonnet further tried to disguise his return to piracy by engaging in a pretence of trade with the next two vessels he robbed. Soon afterward, Bonnet quit the charade of trading and reverted to naked piracy. In July 1718, he cruised north to Delaware Bay, pillaging another eleven vessels. He took several prisoners, some of whom joined his pirate crew. While Bonnet set loose most of his prizes after looting them, he retained control of the last two ships he captured: the sloops Francis and Fortune. On 1 August 1718, the Royal James and the two captured sloops sailed southward from Delaware Bay. The captured sloops lagged behind, and Bonnet threatened to sink them if they did not stay closer. During the passage, Bonnet and his crew divided their loot into shares of about £10 or £11 and distributed them amongst themselves. This is the only time Bonnet is known to have practised this pirate custom, and it suggests he had by then abandoned his unorthodox practice of paying regular wages to his crew.

Twelve days out of Delaware Bay, Bonnet entered the estuary of the Cape Fear River and anchored near the mouth of a small waterway, now known as Bonnet's Creek. The Royal James had begun to leak badly and was in need of careening. Shortly afterwards, a small shallop entered the river and was captured. Bonnet had the shallop broken up to help repair the Royal James. The work of careening was done, in whole or in part, by the prisoners Bonnet had captured. Bonnet threatened at least one man with marooning if he did not work with the slaves to repair the Royal James. Bonnet remained in the Cape Fear River for the next 45 days. According to Bonnet's boatswain, Ignatius Pell, the pirates intended to wait out the hurricane season there.

Battle of Cape Fear River

By the end of August, news had reached Charles Town that Bonnet's vessels were moored in the Cape Fear River. Robert Johnson, governor of South Carolina, authorised Colonel William Rhett to lead a naval expedition against the pirates, even though the Cape Fear River was in North Carolina's jurisdiction. After a false start due to the appearance of another pirate ship near Charles Town, Rhett arrived at the mouth of the Cape Fear River on 26 September with two eight-gun sloops, the Henry and the Sea Nymph, and a force of 130 militia men. Bonnet initially mistook Rhett's squadron for merchantmen and sent three canoes to capture them. Rhett's flagship Henry had run aground in the river mouth, enabling Bonnet's canoe crews to approach, recognize the heavily armed and crewed sloops as hostile and return uninjured to warn Bonnet. The sun had set by the time the rising tide lifted the Henry off the river bottom.

The 46 pirates were scattered among the three sloops. During the night, Bonnet brought all of them aboard the Royal James and planned to fight his way out to sea in the morning rather than risk the Cape Fear River's narrow channels in the dark. Bonnet also wrote a letter to Governor Johnson, threatening to burn all the ships in Charles Town Harbour. At daybreak, on 27 September 1718, Bonnet set sail toward Rhett's force, and all three sloops opened fire, initiating the Battle of Cape Fear River. The two South Carolinian sloops split up in an effort to bracket the Royal James. Bonnet tried to avoid the trap by steering the Royal James close to the river's western shore, but ran aground in the process. Rhett's closing sloops also ran aground, leaving only the Henry in range of the Royal James.

The battle was at a stalemate for the next five or six hours, with all the participants immobilized. Bonnet's men had the advantage that their deck was heeled away from their opponents, giving them cover, while the Henrys deck was tilted toward the pirates, thus exposing Rhett's men to punishing musket volleys. Bonnet's force suffered twelve casualties while killing ten and wounding fourteen of Rhett's 70-man crew. Most of Bonnet's men fought enthusiastically, challenging their enemies to board and fight hand to hand, and tying a knot in their flag as a mock signal to come aboard and render aid. Bonnet himself patrolled the deck with a pistol drawn, threatening to kill any pirate who faltered in the fight. Nevertheless, some of the prisoners who had been forced to join the pirate crew refused to fire on Rhett's men, and one narrowly escaped death at Bonnet's hands in the confusion of the engagement.

The battle was ultimately decided when the rising tide lifted Rhett's sloops free while temporarily leaving the Royal James stranded. Bonnet was left helpless, watching while the enemy vessels repaired their rigging and closed to board his paralysed vessel. Outnumbered almost three to one, Bonnet's men would have had little hope of winning a boarding action. Bonnet ordered his gunner, George Ross, to blow up the Royal Jamess powder magazine. Ross apparently attempted this, but was overruled by the remainder of the crew, who surrendered. Rhett arrested the pirates and returned to Charles Town with his prisoners on 3 October 1718.

Escape, recapture, and execution

In Charles Town, Bonnet was separated from the bulk of his crew and held for three weeks along with his boatswain, Ignatius Pell, and his sailing master, David Herriott, at the home of Town Marshal Nathaniel Partridge. Pirate Edward Robinson, the gunner from Newcastle upon Tyne, and the remaining crew were held outside of Charles Town at the Watch House, at White Point. On 24 October, Bonnet and Herriott escaped, probably by colluding with local merchant Richard Tookerman. Governor Johnson at once placed a £700 bounty on Bonnet's head and dispatched search teams to track him down. Bonnet and Herriott, accompanied by a slave and a Native American, obtained a boat and made for the north shore of Charles Town Harbour, but foul winds and lack of supplies forced the four of them onto Sullivan's Island. Governor Johnson sent a posse under Rhett to Sullivan's Island to hunt for Bonnet. The posse discovered Bonnet after an extensive search, and opened fire, killing Herriott and wounding the two slaves. Bonnet surrendered and was returned to Charles Town. While awaiting trial, some sort of civil uprising in his support took place within the city, an event authorities would later describe as having nearly resulted in the burning of the town and the overthrow of the government. Bonnet possibly awaited his execution in the Court of Guard, a militia guardhouse in the city where the current Exchange and Provost stands today.

On 10 November 1718, Bonnet was brought to trial before Sir Nicholas Trott, sitting in his capacity as Vice-Admiralty judge. Trott had already sat in judgment on Bonnet's crew and sentenced most of them to hang. Bonnet was formally charged with only two acts of piracy, against the Francis and the Fortune, whose commanders were on hand to testify against Bonnet in person. Ignatius Pell had turned King's evidence in the trial of Bonnet's crew and testified, somewhat reluctantly, against Bonnet. Bonnet pleaded not guilty and conducted his own defence without assistance of counsel, cross-examining the witnesses to little avail, and calling a character witness in his favour. Trott rendered a damning summation of the evidence, and the jury delivered a guilty verdict. Two days later, after treating the convicted man to a stern lecture on his violation of Christian duties, Trott sentenced Bonnet to death.

While awaiting his execution, Bonnet wrote to Governor Johnson, begging abjectly for clemency and promising to have his own arms and legs cut off as assurance that he would never again commit piracy. Charles Johnson wrote that Bonnet's visibly disintegrating mind moved many Carolinians to pity, particularly the female population, and London papers later reported that the governor delayed his execution seven times. Bonnet was eventually hanged at White Point Garden, in Charles Town, on 10 December 1718.

Legacy

Bonnet's authority
The actual degree of authority any pirate captain exercised over his crew was questionable, as he had no access to the procedures and sanctions of admiralty law that supported government captains. Many pirate captains were elected by their crews and could be deposed in the same manner. Because of his ignorance of nautical matters, Bonnet was in an even weaker position than other pirate captains, as is demonstrated by the utter domination Blackbeard exercised over him during their collaboration. During Bonnet's early career, his crew seems to have been less than loyal to him and to have greatly preferred the more charismatic and experienced Blackbeard.

At his trial, Bonnet downplayed his own authority over his pirate crew. He told the court that his crew engaged in piracy against his will, and said he had warned them that he would leave the crew unless they stopped robbing vessels. He further stated that he had been asleep during the capture of the sloop Francis. The court did not accept these protestations. Boatswain Ignatius Pell testified that Bonnet's quartermaster, Robert Tucker, had more power than Bonnet. A powerful quartermaster appears to have been a common feature of pirate crews in the early modern era.

Nevertheless, Bonnet's crew represented him as being a leader, and it appears likely that, after his rescue of Blackbeard's marooned crewmen, he became at least a co-equal commander aboard the Royal James. He appears to have been entrusted with the company's treasure, and made most major command decisions such as the direction of the ship and what vessels to attack. Most significantly, at Delaware Bay he ordered two of his crew to be flogged for breaches of discipline. Pirates did not lightly submit to flogging, as they resented the frequent use of this punishment in the naval and merchant services from which most of them came, and thus only a leader who commanded the obedience of his crew could successfully order such penalties.

Bonnet's pirate flag

Bonnet's flag is traditionally represented as a white skull above a horizontal long bone between a heart and a dagger, all on a black field. Despite the frequent appearance of this flag in modern pirate literature, no known early-Georgian period source describes any such device, much less attributes it to Bonnet. This version of Bonnet's flag is probably one of a number of pirate flags appearing on an undated manuscript with unknown provenance in Britain's National Maritime Museum, which was donated by Dr. Philip Gosse in 1939. Bonnet's crew and contemporaries generally referred to him flying a "bloody flag", which likely means a dark red flag. There is also a report from the 1718 The Boston News-Letter of Bonnet flying a death's head flag during his pursuit of the Protestant Caesar, with no mention of colour or of any long bone, heart, or dagger.

Walking the plank
Bonnet is alleged to have been one of the few pirates to make his prisoners walk the plank. No contemporaneous source makes any mention of Bonnet forcing prisoners to walk the plank, and modern scholars such as Marcus Rediker, Professor of History at the University of Pittsburgh, generally agree that the whole concept of pirates forcing prisoners to walk the plank belongs to a later age than Bonnet's.

Popular culture

Bonnet has been portrayed several times in literature. His life was turned into a story by the French author Marcel Schwob in his book Imaginary Lives. He is a major character in Tim Powers' On Stranger Tides, along with other famous pirate characters, particularly Blackbeard. In this novel, Bonnet takes up piracy after having been framed by Blackbeard, who has used Bonnet's hatred for his wife (only married two years in the novel) against him. Kate Bonnet: The Romance of a Pirate's Daughter, by the 19th-century American author Frank R. Stockton, is a satirical novel relating the adventures of a fictional daughter of Bonnet named Kate. Portrayals of Bonnet also extend to video games, such as Sid Meier's Pirates! and Assassin's Creed IV: Black Flag. In the 1941 film The Devil and Daniel Webster, the Devil summons Bonnet to join a jury of the damned, announcing Bonnet and fellow seaman Floyd Ireson as "the fiendish butchers".

A plaque commemorating Bonnet stands near Bonnet's Creek in Southport, North Carolina, on the Cape Fear River. The Yacht Basin Provision Company also holds an annual Stede Bonnet Regatta near Southport, commemorating the infamous pirate's dash for the ocean.

The radio program This American Life produced a feature on May 5, 2017, on pirates. In the prologue, host Ira Glass spoke to producer Elna Baker about the life of Stede Bonnet. The podcast Real Pirates discusses Bonnet and Blackbeard across five episodes, with appearances by Stede Bonnet biographer Jeremy R. Moss and pirate historians and authors Dr. Rebecca Simon, Colin Woodard and Eric Jay Dolan.

The period comedy television series Our Flag Means Death, created by David Jenkins, stars Rhys Darby as Stede Bonnet and Taika Waititi as Blackbeard. Jenkins depicts a romantic relationship between the two.

On April 11, 2022, Theatre Three of Dallas, Texas presented the world premiere production of the musical comedy Stede Bonnet: A F*cking Pirate Musical.  Nicole Neely conceived and wrote the play's book; Clint Gilbert composed the music and lyrics; Danielle Georgiou directed and choreographed the production; and Danny Anchondo, Jr. directed the music.

Notes

References

Bibliography

 Botting, Douglas. The Pirates. Time-Life Books, Inc., 1978. .
 
 
 
 Fox, Edward Theophilus. Piratical Schemes and Contracts: Pirate Articles and Their Society 1660-1730. Exeter: University of Exeter, 2013.

External links

 A Biography of Stede Bonnet 
 Proceedings of Stede Bonnet's Trial from A Complete Collection of State Trials and Proceedings for High Treason and Other Crimes and Misdemeanors from the Earliest Period to the Year 1783 by Thomas Bayly Howell and William Cobbett, from Google Books

1688 births
1718 deaths
17th-century Barbadian people
18th-century Barbadian people
17th-century English people
18th-century English people
18th-century pirates
Barbadian pirates
British pirates
English Jacobites
Privateers
British military personnel of the War of the Spanish Succession
Recipients of American gubernatorial pardons
Pardoned pirates
People executed for piracy
Executed English people
Executed Barbadian people
People executed by the Thirteen Colonies by hanging
People executed by South Carolina by hanging
People executed by the Kingdom of Great Britain
English escapees
Escapees from South Carolina detention
People from Bridgetown
Barbadian people of English descent